Paula Marama (born 13 February 1984) is a retired New Zealand female tennis player.

In her career, she won one singles title and ten doubles titles on the ITF circuit. On 27 September 2004, she reached her best singles ranking of world number 443. On 26 April 2004, she peaked at world number 289 in the doubles rankings.

Playing for New Zealand at the Fed Cup, Marama has a win–loss record of 5–3.

ITF Circuit finals

Singles: 1 (1–0)

Doubles: 12 (10–2)

References

External links
 
 
 

New Zealand female tennis players
1984 births
Living people
Sportspeople from Wellington City
21st-century New Zealand women